The Daman Ganga also called Dawan River is a river in western India. The river's headwaters are on the western slope of the Western Ghats range, and it flows west into the Arabian Sea. The river flows through Maharashtra and Gujarat states, as well as the Union territory of Dadra and Nagar Haveli and Daman and Diu. The industrial towns of Vapi, Dadra and Silvassa lie on the north bank of the river, and the town of Daman occupies both banks of the river's estuary.

The major development project on the river is the Daman Ganga Multipurpose project completed which benefits the state of Gujarat and the Union Territory of Dadra Nagar Haveli and Daman and Diu. In 2015, a major river interlinking project involving inter-basin transfer of surplus water from the Daman Ganga called the "Daman Ganga-Pinjal River Linking Project" has been approved for implementation.

The two historical forts on either side of the river at Daman, are the Moti Daman ('Moti' means "big") on the southern bank and the Nani Daman ('Nani' means "small"), on the northern bank.

Geography 

The Daman Ganga, also known as Dawan River, rises in the Sahyadri hills close to Ambegaon village in Dindori taluka of Nasik district of Maharashtra State. It raise at an elevation of 950m. Major part of the river lies in Maharashtra. Some of major tributaries which originate and flow through the mountainous region of the states of Maharashtra, Gujarat and the Union Territory of Dadra and Nagar Haveli and Daman and Diu are Dawan, Shrimant, Val, Rayate, Lendi, Wagh, Sakartond, Roshni, Dudhni, and Piperiya. As the river joins the sea at Daman, it is named Daman Ganga. At the estuary there is heavy sedimentation and hence the depth of water is shallow. Daman is located on both banks of the river (Portuguese name: Rio Sandalcalo). At the mouth of the river the bar is level bed made of hard sand, except for the North of the North point where the river enters the sea.

Catchment area distribution is: In the Nashik district of Maharashtra  (60.74%); in the Valsad district in Gujarat  (21.36%); and in the Union territory of Dadra and Nagar Haveli and Daman and Diu it is  (17.90%). The mean annual run off from the catchment is 3,771 MCM (million cubic metres). The upstream area of the river is hilly and covered with forest . The soil conditions in the basin are categorized as "reddish brown soil, coarse shallow soil, deep black soil and Coastal alluvial soil". Silvassa, Vapi and Daman are the major towns on the banks of the river.

The places of tourist interest on the Daman Ganga River in Dadra and Nagar Haveli are Van Ganga and Vandhara Garden. There are also two historical forts on either side of the river at Daman, which face each other, known as Moti Daman on the southern bank, the larger of the two and the Nani Daman, smaller in size, on the northern bank.

Development

Damanganga Reservoir Project
There is an existing major irrigation project on the river called the Damanganga Reservoir Project, which is located near Madhuban village in Dharampur taluka of Valsad district of Gujarat. It is an inter-state multipurpose project of the Govt. of Gujarat and Union Territory of Dadra and Nagar Haveli and Daman and Diu (DNHDD). The storage of this project is shared by the riparian state of Gujarat and Union Territory of DNHDD as the beneficiary region. The total volume of water to be shared is 516.63 MCM (million cubic metres) (420.50 MCM for irrigation and the balance 96.13 MCM for other uses, which is allotted to the riparian state and Union Territories; Gujarat has a share of 399.19 MCM, Dadra and Nagar Haveli's share is 83.33 MCM and of Daman is 34.20 MCM. The project was built from 1972 to 1998. It is a composite dam of masonry and earth-fill dams. The masonry dam of 58.6 m height with a spillway in the gorge section of the river of 350 m length; the spillway, with an ogee shape and a roller bucket for energy dissipation, is designed to rout a Probable Maximum Flood (PMF) discharge of 25,850 cumecs (cubic meters per second) controlled by 10 radial gates each of size  . It has earth dams on both its flanks which measures . The composite dam is founded in area with geological formations of amygdaloidal basalt, porphyritic basalt, dolerite, and agglomerate.

Submergence also involved 12 villages completely and 24 villages partially. Irrigation covers 112 villages in Valsad district, 26 villages in Daman, and 24 villages in Dadra Nagar Haveli. The Project provides 58 million gallons per day for industrial and domestic water needs and also has a small power plant of 2 MW capacity. The cost of the project was shared between the participating states as per the Inter-State Agreement of 1992.

The river supplies potable drinking water to Vapi town, industries around the town and 11 villages in Daman from the head works located on the pick up weir on Daman Ganga River.

Daman Ganga-Pinjal River Linking Project
The Government of India's National Water Development Authority (NWDA) has proposed the Daman Ganga-Pinjal River Linking Project linking the Daman Ganga River to the Pinjal reservoir on the Pinjal River to the south, in the Vaitarna basin allowing surplus water from the Daman Ganga to be diverted south to Mumbai via the Pinjal reservoir. The feasibility report was prepared by NWDA in 2004, and in 2010 a tripartite agreement was signed between the Central government and the two state governments of Gujarat and Maharashtra. In January 2015, the project was approved for implementation.

Under this project the two reservoirs to be created by building dams are the Bhugad dam  on Damanganga River in Gujarat and the Khargihill dam on the Vagh River near Behapada village in Thane in Maharashtra. The implementation of the entire project is planned to be completed over a nine-year period.

River pollution
The Damanganga River downstream of Vapi up to its confluence with the sea is polluted from the effluents emerging from the industrial and domestic wastes of the Vapi town, Silvassa, Daman and Kachigaon. According to the Central Pollution Control Board's report the BOD value recorded at its monitoring station downstream of Kachogaon was a high of 30 mgl per liter. According to a study report of the Machhimar Adhikar Rahstriya Abhiyan due to the industrial effluents from the Vapi town the dissolved oxygen level is very low ar 0.1-mg/1 and Mercury content in the groundwater in the town is about ninety six times higher than the standards prescribed by the World Health Organization (WHO). Untreated effluents are directly discharged into the Damanganga and Kolak Rivers. This has resulted in pollution of the sea water to a limit of five nautical miles seriously affecting fish life. The Common Effluent Treatment was also reported to be dis-functional with about 1000 small-scale and artisanal fishers in four to five villages getting affected on account of  the Sarigam Industrial Association's effluent disposal pipeline.

Gallery

See also

List of rivers of India
Rivers of India

References

Bibliography

External links 

Rivers of Dadra and Nagar Haveli and Daman and Diu
Rivers of Maharashtra
Rivers of Gujarat
Rivers of India